Pakuria is a village in the Pakuria CD block in the Pakur subdivision of the Pakur district in the Indian state of Jharkhand.

Geography

Location

Overview
Rajmahal coalfield is shown in the map. The entire area is overwhelmingly rural with only small pockets of urbanisation.

Note: The full screen map is interesting. All places marked on the map are linked and you can easily move on to another page of your choice. Enlarge the map to see what else is there – one gets railway links, many more road links and so on.

Demographics
According to the 2011 Census of India, Pakuria had a total population of 3,234, of which 1,678 (52%) were males and 1,556 (48%) were females. Population in the age range 0–6 years was 394. The total number of literate persons in Pakuria was 2,390 (84.15% of the population over 6 years).

Civic administration

Police station
Pakuria police station serves Pakuria CD block.

CD block HQ
Headquarters of Pakuria CD block is at Pakuria village.

Education
Pakuriya High School is a Hindi-medium coeducational institution established in 1957. It has facilities for teaching from class IX to class XII.

Pakuriya Girls High School is a Hindi-medium girls only institution established in 1932. It has facilities for teaching from class V to class X.

Project Girls High School Pakuriya is a Hindi-medium girls only institution established in 1984. It has facilities for teaching from class VIII to class X.

References

Villages in Pakur district